Miss International Germany (Miss Deutschland-International) is a national beauty pageant in under MGO (Komitee Miss Deutschland) in Germany to select an official candidate for the Miss International pageant.

History
Between 1960 and 1990 the Miss Germany runner-up or winner went to Miss International. In 1991, the MGA (Miss Germany Association, Bergheim near Cologne) of Detlef Tursies run a Miss Germany pageant for the first time. The winners participate in Miss Universe, Miss International, Miss Europe, and Miss Intercontinental pageant. In 1999, MGA transforms into MGO (Miss Germany Organisation). From 2000, they award the title Miss Deutschland, and change their name again: MGO - Komitee Miss Deutschland. Traditionally, the official winner will be competing at the Miss Universe pageant. In 2009, MGO lost the franchise of Miss Universe.

Titleholders
Color key

Before 2009 the runners-up of Miss Deutschland went to Miss International, in addition the winner sometimes competed at the pageant.

1991-1999 : MGA - Miss Germany Association GmbH (Bergheim near Cologne)
In 1999 Miss MGA replaced as MGO which held the official Miss Germany to Miss Universe, Miss International and Miss Europe.

1960-1990

See also
Miss Germany
Miss Universe Germany
Miss World Germany
Miss Earth Germany

References

Official website
Miss Deutschland
 

Beauty pageants in Germany 
Recurring events established in 1991
1991 establishments in Germany
Germany
German awards